Barisone may refer to:

Barisone I of Torres, the giudice of Arborea from c. 1038 until c. 1060 and then of Logudoro until his death sometime c. 1073
Barisone II of Arborea, the giudice of Arborea, a kingdom of Sardinia, from 1146 to 1186
Barisone II of Gallura (died 1203), the Judge of Gallura from c. 1170 to his death
Barisone II of Torres, (died 1191), the giudice of Logudoro from 1153 to 1186
Barisone III of Torres (1221–1236), briefly the Judge of Logudoro from 1232 until his death
Diego Barisone (1989–2015), Argentine footballer